Daniil Sergeyevich Ostapenko (born 8 June 1995) is a Russian football player.

Club career
He played his first game for the main squad of FC Rostov on 24 September 2015 in a Russian Cup game against FC Tosno.

References

External links
 

1995 births
Living people
Russian footballers
Association football midfielders
FC Rostov players
FC Znamya Truda Orekhovo-Zuyevo players
FC Olimpia Volgograd players
FC Mashuk-KMV Pyatigorsk players